Jeof srl was an Italian aircraft manufacturer based in Candiana. The company specialized in the design and manufacture of ultralight aircraft in the form of kits for amateur construction for the European Fédération Aéronautique Internationale microlight category.

The company was a Società a responsabilità limitata.

The company developed the Jeof Candiana as a testbed for the Sax 86 engine, which is a derivative of the Fiat Fire four-cylinder four-stroke automotive powerplant. At least ten Candianas were built. The company also produced the Jeof Jeofox.

Aircraft

References

Defunct aircraft manufacturers of Italy
Ultralight aircraft
Homebuilt aircraft